Eating Media Lunch (EML) was a satirical New Zealand news show hosted by Jeremy Wells. It aired on TV2 from 2003 to 2008. The show was frequently controversial during its run.

Notable episodes 
In 2005 it shocked some viewers when it depicted two newsreaders fornicating (a parody of Naked News). It frequently caused complaints to the Broadcasting Standards Authority, ranging from complaints about the show's treatment of New Zealand celebrities to complaints about an episode which showed a cat in a microwave oven. Producer Paul Casserly noted that portrayals of violence against animals were certain to attract complaints, such as the show which claimed to feature famous sheep Shrek being slaughtered, while the spoof Maori porn movie 'Anal Mana' saw no complaints.

Innovations 
The show features a regular animated segment by Anthony Ellison titled Media Dog which was available online. Since 2004 the series had included an annual 'awards' show which  "honour[s] the absurd and the unusual as seen on television, radio and newspapers" categories include: "Services to Scaremongering, Worst Moment on Reality TV, The Inappropriate Touching Award and the much coveted New Zealander of the Year trophy."

The 2006 season featured former Close Up reporter Hugh Sundae as well as Matt Heath and Chris Stapp from Back of the Y. According to TVNZ the 2006 season tackled "racism, reality TV and the country's best-known protesters". The 2008 season won best comedy at the Qantas Film and TV Awards.

Last season 
In 2009 when TVNZ faced $25 million in budget cuts as a result of the recession and declining advertising revenue, the network made the decision not to commission a 2009 season of Eating Media Lunch.

See also 
The Unauthorised History of New Zealand, satirical series also hosted by Wells

References

External links

Video extract from the show
Report on the Cancellation of EML

2000s New Zealand television series
2003 New Zealand television series debuts
2008 New Zealand television series endings
New Zealand satirical television shows
Television shows filmed in New Zealand
Television shows funded by NZ on Air
TVNZ 2 original programming
News parodies